Charles Lenmore Richards (October 3, 1877 – December 22, 1953) was an American lawyer and United States Representative from Nevada.

Born in Austin, Nevada, Richards attended public schools in Nevada and Pennsylvania. He graduated from the law department of Stanford University, in 1901. He was admitted to the bar and commenced practice in Tonopah, Nevada, in 1901. He was the district attorney of Nye County in 1903 and 1904. In 1919 he was a member of the Nevada Assembly and moved to Reno. He served as chairman of the Democratic State committee in 1922 and as councilor from Nevada to the United States Chamber of Commerce from March 29, 1923, to May 20, 1924.

Richards was elected as a Democrat to the Sixty-eighth Congress (March 4, 1923 – March 3, 1925). He ran for reelection in 1924 but did not win. He resumed the practice of law in Reno until his death there on December 22, 1953. He was buried in Mountain View Cemetery.

References

1877 births
1953 deaths
District attorneys in Nevada
Democratic Party members of the Nevada Assembly
Nevada lawyers
Stanford Law School alumni
State political party chairs of Nevada
People from Lander County, Nevada
Democratic Party members of the United States House of Representatives from Nevada
People from Tonopah, Nevada